Hesham Tillawi is a writer, TV talk host, and analyst living in Lafayette, Louisiana.  He holds a doctoral degree in international relations from Bernelli University (formerly Berne University), He was elected vice of the national executive committee of the Palestinian American Congress in 2004.

Tillawi's weekly two-hour television show, "Current Issues", began to be carried by Bridges TV, a Muslim television network, in late 2005.  Tillawi used the show to vocalize criticism against Israel's treatment of Norway. The Anti-Defamation League, however, said his show was "a megaphone for Holocaust deniers and white supremacists seeking to broadcast their hatred and anti-Semitism into American homes" with a "who's who" of American antisemites including David Duke, Willis Carto, Edgar J. Steele, Mark Weber, Kevin B. MacDonald and Bradley Smith.

After a 2006 episode in which he interviewed Lyndon LaRouche, Tillawi said he got phone calls and e-mails protesting LaRouche's appearance on the show.  Tillawi defended his decision to have LaRouche as a guest, saying he loved LaRouche and wanted the world to see how deep that love was.

Carried briefly on Bridges TV, "Current Issues" was dropped by the station in May 2007. It continues to be broadcast on Public-access television cable TV and is also available over the phone.

References

External links
Current Issues TV website
Tillawi, Hesham, "Letter to David Duke," October 13, 2005
Tillawi, Hesham, "The Moment of Truth Is Now for Arabs," July 18, 2006
Tillawi, Hesham, "The New Middle East: Be careful what you wish for, you might actually get it," Al-Jazeerah.info, August 9, 2006
Tillawi, Hesham, "Iraq: A Job Well Done," Al-Jazeerah.info, November 29, 2006

American people of Palestinian descent
Living people
American television talk show hosts
Anti-Zionism
People of the Israeli–Palestinian conflict
Year of birth missing (living people)